Nizami is both a surname and a given name. Notable people with the name include:

Surname:
 Farhan Nizami (born before 1977), Islamic scholar at the University of Oxford
 Hameed Nizami (1915–1962), Pakistani journalist
 Majid Nizami (born 1928), Pakistani editor and publisher
 Motiur Rahman Nizami (born 1943), Bangladeshi politician

Given name:
 Nizami Aruzi (fl. 1110–1161), writer of Persian prose and poetry in the 12th century, famous for the Chahar Maqala
 Nizami Bahmanov (1948−2008), Azerbaijani politician
 Nizami Ganjavi (1141−1209), considered the greatest romantic epic poet in Persian history 
 Nizami Hajiyev (born 1988), Azerbaijani football midfielder
 Nizami Pashayev (born 1981), Azerbaijani weightlifter